Buolick is a townland in the civil parish of the same name in County Tipperary, Ireland.

There is a 15th century tower house in the townland, close to the ruin and graveyard of a medieval church.

References

Townlands of County Tipperary